Hapalips is a genus of pleasing fungus beetles in the family Erotylidae. There are about 12 described species in Hapalips.

Species
These 12 species belong to the genus Hapalips:

 Hapalips angulosus Grouvelle, 1908
 Hapalips bicolor Bruce, 1954
 Hapalips curta Grouvelle, 1919
 Hapalips delauneyi Grouvelle, 1908
 Hapalips dufaui Grouvelle, 1908
 Hapalips guadeloupensis Grouvelle, 1902
 Hapalips lucudus Champion
 Hapalips prolixus (Sharp, 1876)
 Hapalips sculpticollis Champion
 Hapalips sharpi Grouvelle, 1908
 Hapalips taprobanae (Grouvelle, 1902)
 Hapalips texanus Schaeffer, 1910

References

Further reading

 
 

Erotylidae
Articles created by Qbugbot